Malik Nauman Ahmad Langrial is a Pakistani politician who was a member of the Provincial Assembly of the Punjab from August 2018 till May 2022.

Previously he was a member of the National Assembly of Pakistan from 2008 to 2013 and a member of the Provincial Assembly of the Punjab from 2002 to 2007.

Early life and education
He was born on 25 June 1960 in Lahore.

He graduated in 1989 and has a degree of Bachelor of Arts.

Political career
He was elected to the Provincial Assembly of the Punjab from Constituency PP-226 (Sahiwal-VII) as a candidate of National Alliance in 2002 Pakistani general election. He received 33,693 votes and defeated Mian Asad Masood, a candidate of Pakistan Peoples Party (PPP).

He was elected to the National Assembly of Pakistan from Constituency NA-163 (Sahiwal-IV) as a candidate of Pakistan Muslim League (Q) (PML-Q) in 2008 Pakistani general election. He received 39,864 votes and defeated Begum Shahnaz Javed, a candidate of PPP.

He ran for the seat of the National Assembly from Constituency NA-163 (Sahiwal-IV) as a candidate of PML (Q) in 2013 Pakistani general election but was unsuccessful. He received 67,076 votes and lost the seat to Muhammad Munir Azhar.

He was re-elected to the Provincial Assembly of the Punjab as a candidate of Pakistan Tehreek-e-Insaf (PTI) from Constituency PP-202 (Sahiwal-VII) in 2018 Pakistani general election.

On 27 August 2018, he was inducted into the provincial Punjab cabinet of Chief Minister Sardar Usman Buzdar without any ministerial portfolio. On 29 August 2018, he was appointed as Provincial Minister of Punjab for Agriculture. 

In March, 2021 Langrial became a part of dissenting group called the Janghair Tareen group. The Janghair Tareen group was made after a close friend of Imran Khan and core member of Pakistan Tehreek-e-Insaf was investigated under Sugar scandal during his own government. In April 2, 2022 Langrial joined forward block against his own party Pakistan Tehreek-e-Insaf and supported opposition's candidate Hamza Shahbaz. Chaudhry Pervaiz Elahi send a reference against MPAs including Langrial defected from party's policy.

He de-seated due to vote against party policy for Chief Minister of Punjab election  on 16 April 2022. On 13 September 2022, he was inducted into Shehbaz Sharif Cabinet as SAPM.

References

Living people
Pakistani MNAs 2008–2013
1968 births
Punjab MPAs 2002–2007
Pakistan Tehreek-e-Insaf MPAs (Punjab)
Provincial ministers of Punjab